
Gmina Osieczna is an urban-rural gmina (administrative district) in Leszno County, Greater Poland Voivodeship, in west-central Poland.

Villages
Apart from the town of Osieczna, Gmina Osieczna contains the villages and settlements of Adamowo, Berdychowo, Chmielkowo, Dobramyśl, Drzeczkowo, Frankowo, Górka, Grodzisko, Jeziorki, Kąkolewo, Kąty, Kleszczewo, Kopanina, Łoniewo, Maciejewo, Miąskowo, Nowe Wolkowo, Popowo Wonieskie, Świerczyna, Trzebania, Ustronie, Witosław, Wojnowice, Wolkowo and Ziemnice.

Neighbouring gminas
Gmina Osieczna is bordered by the city of Leszno and by the gminas of Krzemieniewo, Krzywiń, Lipno, Rydzyna and Śmigiel.

References
Polish official population figures 2006

Osieczna
Gmina Osieczna